Izak (or Izaak also Izhak, Itzchak, Itzik, see more options below) is a given name which is an alternate spelling for Isaac. Online sites, such as "Think Baby Names" state that:
Izak \i-zak\ as a boy's name is a variant of Isaac (Hebrew), and the meaning of Izak is "laughter". The baby name Izak sounds like Izik, Izaak, Itzak and Isak. Other similar baby names are Izsak, Zak, Izaac, Isac, Isaak, Isa, Iziah, Isam and Izzy. Izak is not a popular first name for men but a somewhat popular surname or last name for both men and women (#83399 out of 88799). (1990 U.S. Census).

Notable persons with the name include:

Izak
 Izak Aloni, Israeli chess master
 Izak Buys, South Africa cricketer
 Izak Davel, South African actor
 Izak David du Plessis, South African Afrikaans writer
 Izak Moerdijk, Dutch mathematician
 Izak Reid, English sportsman
 Izak Rober, Turkish sportsman
 Izak Šantej, Slovenian motorcyclist
 Izak van der Merwe, South African tennis player
 Izak Van Heerden, South African rugby coach

Izaak
 Izaak Appel, Polish chess master
 Izaak Grunbaum, Israeli politician
 Izaak Grynfeld, Israeli chess master
 Izaak Walton Killam, Canadian financier
 Izaak Kolthoff, Dutch chemist
 Izaak H. Reijnders, Dutch military commander.
 Izaak Towbin, Polish chess master
 Izaak Walton, English writer

Izaac
 Izaac Johanes Wanggai, Indonesian sportsman
 Izaac Wang, American child actor
 Izaac Williams, New Zealand sportsman

Isak
 Isak Gustaf Clason, Swedish architect
 Isak Dinesen, pen name of Karen Blixen, Danish author
 Isak-Beg, ruler near Ottoman Empire
 Isak From (born 1967), Swedish politician
 Per Isak Juuso, Swedish-Sámi artisan and teacher
 Kim Isak, former member of the Isak N Jiyeon Korean singing duo
 Isak Musliu, Yugoslavian camp guard
 Isak Saba, Norwegian leader
 Isak Valtersen, fictional character in the Norwegian TV show Skam

Itzhak
 Itzhak Perlman, Israeli-American musician
 Itzhak Rabin, Israeli leader
 Itzhak Shum, Israeli sportsman
 Itzhak Ben-Zvi, Israeli president
 Itzhak Katzenelson, Jewish intellectual
 Itzhak Shamir, Israeli politician
 Itzhak Fintzi, Bulgarian actor
 Itzhak Stern, Holocaust survivor
 Itzhak Bentov, Czech intellectual
 Itzhak Sadeh, Israeli leader

Itzchak
 Itzchak Tarkay, Israeli painter

Itzik
 Itzik Zohar, Israeli sportsman
 Itzik Manger, Yiddish intellectual
 Itzik Feffer, Soviet intellectual
 Itzik Kol, Israeli TV producer
 Itzik Kornfein, Israeli sportsman
 Dalia Itzik, Israeli politician

Izhak
 Izhak Mamistvalov, Israeli swimmer
 Izhak Graziani, Israeli conductor

Izsak
 Izsák Lőwy, Hungarian industrialist
 Imre Izsák (1929–1965), Hungarian scientist
 Carolina Izsak (born 1971), Venezuelan beauty queen
 Meir ben Izsak Eisenstadt (1670–1744), Jewish rabbi

Other
 Isakas Vistaneckis, Lithuanian chess master
 Isaka Cernak, Australian sportsman

See also
 Isak (surname)
 Isaac (disambiguation)
 Isaacs (disambiguation)
 Ishak (disambiguation)
 Zack (disambiguation)
 Izzy (disambiguation)
 Izak catsharks

References

Hebrew masculine given names
Masculine given names